Norwegian College of General Sciences or AVH is a former Norwegian college which from 1968 to 1996 was part of the University of Trondheim (UNIT). It was created as the Norwegian College of Teaching in Trondheim (NLHT) in 1922, a name which it retained until 1984. In 1968 it became part of the new university in Trondheim, but in practice it retained much of its former autonomy. The college received its final name in 1984. In 1996 it was merged with the rest of the university to create the new Norwegian University of Science and Technology (NTNU).

The college had three campuses, located at Rosenborg (chemistry and biology), Lade (mathematics, physics, informatics and psychology) and Dragvoll (social studies and humanities). The campuses at Rosenborg and Lade were in 2000 abandoned and, except for psychology, moved to Gløshaugen, where the Norwegian Institute of Technology (NTH) was located. The campus at Lade has been converted to apartments and offices while the buildings at Rosenborg have been razed and replaced by apartments.

Defunct universities and colleges in Norway
Education in Trøndelag
Norwegian University of Science and Technology
1922 establishments in Norway
Educational institutions established in 1922